Herbert Sidney Maffett (March 5, 1907 – December 26, 1994) was a college football player.

University of Georgia
Maffett was a prominent end and four-year starter on the Georgia Bulldogs football team. He was elected captain of the 1930 team due to the victory over Yale at the dedication of Sanford Stadium. He was selected All-Southern in 1930, and a first-team All-American by the New York Evening Post. He once described facing an angry coach Harry Mehre and how "you feel like you'd like to go off and hide in a hole." Maffett was inducted into the Georgia Sports Hall of Fame in 1981.

References

American football ends
Georgia Bulldogs football players
All-Southern college football players
All-American college football players
1907 births
1994 deaths
Players of American football from Atlanta
People from Toccoa, Georgia
People from Brandon, Florida